Hipswell Moor is an area used for military training, near Catterick Garrison in North Yorkshire, England. It includes parts of the civil parishes of Barden and Hipswell as well as Barden Fell hill ( a.s.l.).

External links 
 Picture of a military road on Hipswell Moor from geograph.org.uk

Geography of North Yorkshire
Moorlands of England
Catterick Garrison